The State Preservation Board preserves and maintains the Texas Capitol, the 1857 General Land Office Building (Texas Capitol Visitors Center), and other designated buildings, their contents and grounds; preserves and maintains the Texas Governor's Mansion; and operates the Bullock Texas State History Museum and the Texas State Cemetery. They also operate the Capitol Gift Shops, Visitors Parking Garage, Parking Meters, Tour Guide Services, and Schedule Public Events.

 Governing Board

History
Established in 1983 by the 68th Legislature of Texas for the purpose of preserving, maintaining, and restoring the State Capitol, General Land Office Building, and their contents and grounds.

References

External links

 Texas State Preservation Board
 Texas State Cemetery
 Bullock Texas State History Museum
 Texas Capitol Gift Shop

State agencies of Texas
1983 establishments in Texas